Valguta is a village in Elva Parish, Tartu County in southern Estonia. It has a population of 170 (as of 2006).

Poet and writer Ernst Enno (1875–1934) was born in Valguta.

References

Villages in Tartu County
Kreis Dorpat